Tony Franks (born 1940) is an English ceramic artist. He was born in Birmingham, and studied ceramics at Wolverhampton College of Art from 1962 until 1966. He was previously Head of Ceramics, and is now an emeritus professor and Research Fellow at Edinburgh College of Art. Until 2007 he was the President of the International Academy of Ceramics. In 2008, he is one of the British artists invited to create work on site for the British pavilion at the FLICAM International Ceramic Art Museum, Shaanxi province, China.

Awards

 Poisson d'Or, 4th International Contemporary Porcelain Triennial, Nyon 1995 
 Honorary Doctor of Arts, University of Wolverhampton

References

English ceramicists
Edinburgh College of Art
Academics of the University of Edinburgh
People from Birmingham, West Midlands
1940 births
Living people